The white-browed woodswallow (Artamus superciliosus) is a medium-sized (~19 cm) passerine bird endemic to Australia. The white-browed woodswallow has very distinctive plumage consisting of white brow over a black head with the upper body being a deep blue-grey and with a chestnut under body. The females are paler then the males. The white-browed woodswallow has a bifurcated (divided) tongue like most woodswallows.

White-browed woodswallows are highly nomadic travelling in pairs to flocks from hundred to thousands of birds. They often wander irregularly around inland Australia, usually heading north for winter in the Northern Territory and central Queensland, and south in spring for nesting. White-browed woodswallows regularly associate with flocks of the masked woodswallow Artamus personatus.

Distribution 
The white-browed wood-swallow is found throughout Australia with higher concentrations in central New South Wales. According to the IUCN Redlist, wood-swallow are considered least of concern.

Ecology and habitat 
They inhabit margins of rainforests, woodlands, inland/coastal scrubs, golf courses, vineyards, suburban streets and arid areas of Australia. They make a ‘tchip-tchip’ call similar to masked woodswallows.

Reproduction 
Breeding occurs between August and December or after rain. The species nests in shrubs, forks of trees, hollow stumps or posts, the nest is usually made of twigs, grass and rootlets. The eggs are white/grey, spotted, or blotched brown-grey. A clutch will usually consist of 2 to 3 eggs.

Diet 
White-browed woodswallows feed on nectar when blossoms are available but mainly feed on insects.

References

External links 
 ABID Images
 White-browed woodswallow videos, photos & sounds on the Internet Bird Collection

white-browed woodswallow
Endemic birds of Australia
white-browed woodswallow
Articles containing video clips
white-browed woodswallow